Saint-Benoît is the name of several communities around the world.

Canada
Saint-Benoît-du-Lac, Quebec, a municipality in the province of Quebec
Saint-Benoît-Labre, Quebec, a municipality in the province of Quebec

France
Saint-Benoît, Ain, in the Ain département 
Saint-Benoît, Alpes-de-Haute-Provence, in the Alpes-de-Haute-Provence département 
Saint-Benoît, Aude, in the Aude département 
Saint-Benoît, Vienne, in the Vienne département
Saint-Benoît, Réunion, in the Réunion département
Saint-Benoît-de-Carmaux, in the Tarn département 
Saint-Benoît-des-Ombres, in the Eure département 
Saint-Benoît-des-Ondes, in the Ille-et-Vilaine  département 
Saint-Benoît-d'Hébertot, in the Calvados département 
Saint-Benoît-du-Sault, in the Indre département 
Saint-Benoit-en-Diois, in the Drôme département 
Saint-Benoît-la-Chipotte, in the Vosges département 
Saint-Benoît-la-Forêt, in the Indre-et-Loire département 
Saint-Benoît-sur-Loire, in the Loiret département 
Saint-Benoît-sur-Seine, in the Aube département 
Saint-Benoist-sur-Mer, in the Vendée département 
Saint-Benoist-sur-Vanne, in the Aube département